Viktor Apostolov (November 1, 1962 – October 30, 2011) was a male hammer thrower from Bulgaria, who represented his native country at the 1988 Summer Olympics in Seoul, South Korea. He set his personal best (80.62 metres) on July 28, 1990, in Sofia.

Achievements

References

External links

1962 births
2011 deaths
Bulgarian male hammer throwers
Athletes (track and field) at the 1988 Summer Olympics
Olympic athletes of Bulgaria